Municipal elections were held in the Canadian province of Manitoba on October 26, 2022. Mayors, councils and school board trustees were elected in the 135 municipalities holding elections.

64 municipalities, approximately 47.5%, had their mayor or reeve acclaimed due to no other candidates running, with one municipality not putting up any candidates.

860 Candidates were elected, out of 1380 original candidates, with only 55.2% of candidates being reelected overall, only 45.5% of mayoral candidates being reelected.  

Selected mayoral and council results are as follows:

Brandon
Results for the city of Brandon are as follows:

Mayoral election

Brandon City Council

Brokenhead
Results for reeve in the Rural Municipality of Brokenhead are as follows:

Reeve

Dauphin
Results for mayor in Dauphin are as follows:

Mayor

East St. Paul
Results for mayor in the Rural Municipality of East St. Paul are as follows:

Mayor

Flin Flon
Results for mayor in Flin Flon are as follows:

Mayor

Gimli
Results for mayor in the Rural Municipality of Gimli are as follows:

Mayor

Hanover
Results for reeve in the Rural Municipality of Hanover are as follows:

Reeve

La Broquerie
Results for reeve in the Rural Municipality of La Broquerie are as follows:

Reeve

Macdonald
Results for reeve in the Rural Municipality of Macdonald are as follows:

Reeve

Morden
Results for mayor in Morden are as follows:

Mayor

Neepawa
Results for mayor in Neepawa are as follows:

Mayor

Niverville
Results for mayor in the town of Niverville are as follows:

Mayor

Portage la Prairie (city)
Results for mayor in the city of Portage la Prairie are as follows:

Mayor

Portage la Prairie (RM)
Results for reeve in the Rural Municipality of Portage la Prairie are as follows:

Reeve

Rhineland
Results for reeve in the Municipality of Rhineland are as follows:

Reeve

Ritchot
Results for mayor in the Rural Municipality of Ritchot are as follows:

Mayor

Rockwood
Results for reeve in the Rural Municipality of Rockwood are as follows:

Reeve

Selkirk
Results for mayor in Selkirk are as follows:

Mayor

Springfield
Results for mayor in the Rural Municipality of Springfield are as follows:

Mayor

St. Andrews
Results for mayor in the Rural Municipality of St. Andrews are as follows:

Mayor

Stanley
Results for reeve in the Rural Municipality of Stanley are as follows:

Reeve

St. Clements
Results for mayor in the Rural Municipality of St. Clements are as follows:

Mayor

Ste. Anne (RM)
Results for reeve in the Rural Municipality of Ste. Anne are as follows:

Reeve

Steinbach
Results for mayor in the city of Steinbach are as follows:

Mayor

Stonewall
Results for mayor in the town of Stonewall are as follows:

Mayor

Taché
Results for mayor in the Rural Municipality of Taché are as follows:

Mayor

The Pas
Results for mayor in the town of The Pas are as follows:

Mayor

Thompson
Results in Thompson were as follows:

Mayor

West St. Paul
Results for mayor in the Rural Municipality of West St. Paul are as follows:

Mayor

Winkler
Results for mayor in the city of Winkler are as follows:

Mayor

Winnipeg

References

External links
Results website

Municipal elections in Manitoba
2022 elections in Canada
2022 in Manitoba
October 2022 events in Canada